, also known as A Record of Youth, is a 1951 Japanese drama film directed by Keisuke Kinoshita. It is based on a collection of letters by writer Isoko Hatano.

Plot
When a family of Tokyo war evacuees arrives at the outskirts of Suwa, they are met with hostility by most villagers. The father, an English professor who had to quit lecturing due to his liberal views, opposes his son Ichirō's wish to enlist at a military school. Ichirō, who previously had to suffer mockery at school for alleged cowardness, is now confronted with his new schoolmates' reluctance and bullied by the son of the local military commander. He is also at odds with his father because of his father's staying at home and reading, while the mother works for the family's income. After Japan's defeat, the commander's son tries to kill Ichirō before committing suicide himself for the inflicted "shame", but Ichirō can fend him off. The ending hints at more peaceful times lying ahead for the family.

Cast
 Akiko Tamura as Mother
 Akira Ishihama as Ichirō
 Chishū Ryū as Father
 Rentarō Mikuni as Teacher Shimomura
 Toshiko Kobayashi as Maid Toyo
 Mutsuko Sakura as Mrs. Yamazaki
 Takeshi Sakamoto as Furukawa
 Ryūji Kita as Principal
 Junji Masuda as Yamazaki

Literary source
The screenplay for Boyhood is based on a compilation of letters exchanged between child psychologist and writer Isoko Hatano and her son in 1944–1946. The book was published in 1950 and became a nationwide bestseller. An English translation was published in 1962.

Awards
Mainichi Film Concour for Best Supporting Actress Akiko Tamura

References

External links
 
 

1951 films
Japanese drama films
1950s Japanese-language films
Japanese black-and-white films
Films based on non-fiction books
Films directed by Keisuke Kinoshita
1951 drama films
1950s Japanese films